The following is a list of football stadiums in South Africa, ordered by capacity. Currently all stadiums with a capacity of 10,000 or more are included.

See also 
 List of African stadiums by capacity
 List of association football stadiums by capacity
 List of stadiums in South Africa

References
 Stadiums in Japan - World Stadiums
 Stadien Südkorea - stadionwelt.de

Stadiums
Football
South Africa